Eremodorea is a monotypic moth genus in the family Geometridae. Its only species, Eremodorea haplopsara, is found in Australia. Both the genus and species were first described by Turner in 1939.

References

Geometridae
Monotypic moth genera